Joseph Owono (1921 – December 17, 1981) was a Cameroonian writer and diplomat. He served as Cameroonian Ambassador to the United States in the 1970s. His novel Tante Bella (Aunt Bella), published in 1959, was the first novel to be published in Cameroon.

References

Cameroonian diplomats
Ambassadors of Cameroon to the United States
Cameroonian male writers
1921 births
1981 deaths
Cameroonian writers